In basketball, points are the sum of the score accumulated through free throws or field goals. The Dutch Basketball League's (DBL) scoring title is awarded to the player with the highest points per game average in a given season.

Scoring leaders

Notes

References

Dutch Basketball League statistical leaders